Karen Elizabeth Hayden Miga is an American geneticist who co-leads the Telomere-to-Telomore (T2T) consortium that released fully complete assembly of the human genome in March 2022. She is an assistant professor of biomolecular engineering at the University of California, Santa Cruz and Associate Director of Human Pangenomics at the UC Santa Cruz Genomics Institute. She was named as "One to Watch" in the 2020 Nature's 10 and one of Time 100’s most influential people of 2022.

Research and career 
In 2012, Miga joined the laboratory of David Haussler at the University of California, Santa Cruz. At UCSC she combined computational and experimental approaches. There she leads the telomere-to-telomere (T2T) consortium, a community based effort that seeks to fully sequence and assemble the human genome.  Her research efforts make use of long-read sequencing strategies. She makes use of the Oxford Nanopore Technologies MinION sequencer, which analyses DNA by detecting changes in current flow when DNA passes through nanopores in a membrane.

Miga is the director of the Human Pangenome Production Center that seeks to contribute to the next human pangenome reference map through the creation of 350 T2T diploid genomes. This map will support the development of personalized therapeutics.

Selected publications

References

External links 

American geneticists
American women geneticists
Living people
Year of birth missing (living people)